Muhammad bin Muhammad bin Yahya Zubarah al-San’ani (born in 1301 AH corresponding to 1884 AD - died in 1381 AH corresponding to 1961 AD) is a Yemeni historian and religious scholar from Sana’a. He held official positions during the era of Imam Yahya, and he is the author of reference writings on the history  Flags of Yemen, and father of the former Mufti of Yemen Ahmed bin Muhammad Zubara.

He was the Prince of Al-Saeed Palace (a warehouse for ammunition and supplies for the Yemeni army), and the son-in-law of Imam Yahya, who married his daughter, Princess Khadija, to his son Ahmed.  Imam Yahya delegated him on official missions to neighboring countries, and was also assigned to travel to Egypt to print important Yemeni books there and publish them outside Yemen.

His most important works 

 "Nil alwatar min tarajim rijal alyaman" in the thirteenth century from the migration of the master of mankind, may God's prayers and peace be upon him, Center for Yemeni Studies and Research, Sana’a.
 "Nubala' alyaman bialqarn althaani eashar lilhijrati" The Dissemination of Custom for the Nobles of Yemen after the Millennium, New Generation Library, Sana'a, 2012
 "Almulhaq altaabie lilbadr altaalae bimahasin" after the seventh century, Dar Al-Maarifa, Beirut
 "Khulasat almutun fi 'anba' wanubala' alyaman" , Center for Islamic Heritage and Research, Sana’a
 "Atihaf almuhtadiyn fi aleutrat alnbwyt" and the Translation of 120 Imams from it.
 "Nushir aleurf linubala' alyaman baed al'alif".
 "lamiat nubala' alyaman" who died in the fourteenth century AH.

References 

1884 births
1961 deaths
Yemeni historians